Stjepan Loparić (born 24 April 1951) is a Croatian former footballer who played as a defender.

Club career 
Loparić played in the National Soccer League in 1974 with Hamilton Croatia. The following season he re-signed with Hamilton, but signed with league rivals Toronto Italia late in the season. During his tenure with Toronto he featured in the NSL Cup final against Toronto Panhellenic where he recorded a goal in a 3–2 defeat. He continued playing in the National Soccer League for the 1977 season for Toronto Croatia. He featured in the promotion/relegation match against Ottawa Tigers where he contributed a goal which helped Croatia remain in the NSL First Division.

In 1978, he played in the North American Soccer League with Toronto Metros-Croatia. In his debut season he played in 28 matches with Toronto.

References  

1951 births
Living people
Footballers from Zagreb
Association football defenders
Yugoslav footballers
Hamilton Croatia players
Toronto Italia players
Toronto Croatia players
Toronto Blizzard (1971–1984) players
Canadian National Soccer League players
North American Soccer League (1968–1984) players
Yugoslav expatriate footballers
Expatriate soccer players in Canada
Yugoslav expatriate sportspeople in Canada